Brandon "Bam" Childress (born March 31, 1982) is a  former gridiron football wide receiver. He was signed by the New England Patriots as an undrafted free agent in 2005. He played college football at Ohio State.  Childress was also a member of the Philadelphia Eagles and Saskatchewan Roughriders.

Early years
Over the course of his junior year playing football at St. Peter Chanel High School in Bedford, Ohio, Childress set school season receiving records for catches (53) and yardage (874). As a basketball player at Chanel, Childress also helped lead the Firebirds to a perfect 26-0 season and the Division III state title averaging 18 points per game.

Chanel's football team went 13-1 during Childress' senior season in 1999. The team lost in the Division V state semi-final to Amanda Clearcreek as Childress amassed more than 300 total yards. For the season, he totaled 41 receptions for 754 yards and 11 touchdowns. He also added over 700 yards on punt returns and over 600 yards on kickoff returns.

Childress closed his career as the school's all-time leader in scoring (202 points), touchdowns (33), receiving yards (2,258), TD receptions (21), punt returns for a touchdown (seven) and all-purpose yardage (7,103).

He was named Ohio's Mr. Football in 1999 as the state's top player.

College years
Signed with OSU as a cornerback in the 2000 recruiting class of then-head coach John Cooper.
Moved to receiver when coach Jim Tressel took over in 2001.
During his five seasons (2000–04) as a member of the Ohio State University football team, Childress made 33 receptions for 392 yards.  He also performed as a kick returner during his career and recorded nine returns for 159 yards.
Was a member of the 2002 BCS National Championship team.
He finally got a chance at meaningful playing time as a senior in 2004 but did not play much during the second half of the season. He finished the year with 17 receptions and 205 yards.
He majored in Family Resource Management.

Professional career

New England Patriots
Childress was signed as an undrafted free agent by the New England Patriots out of college in 2005. He signed a short-term deal, participated in training camp, and played well in the preseason, both as a wide receiver and extra defensive back. Because of his hard work and determination to make the team he earned a spot on the New England Patriots practice squad. Childress was activated for the last game of the 2005 season against the Miami Dolphins and played well in a losing effort, finishing with three catches for thirty-two yards.

Prior to the Patriots' 2006 season opener, the team released him, signed him to their practice squad, and then activated him again. After the opener, he was released, signed to the practice squad, and later activated on December 23. Childress spent all of the 2007 on the Patriots' practice squad.

Philadelphia Eagles
After Childress' practice squad contract expired following the 2007 season, he signed a two-year contract with the Philadelphia Eagles on February 22, 2008. He was waived on August 29, 2008.

Saskatchewan Roughriders
Childress was signed by the Saskatchewan Roughriders of the Canadian Football League on January 12, 2009. He was a final cut on June 25, 2009.

References

External links
New England Patriots bio
Philadelphia Eagles bio
Saskatchewan Roughriders bio

1982 births
Living people
American football wide receivers
American football cornerbacks
Players of American football from Ohio
American players of Canadian football
Canadian football wide receivers
Ohio State Buckeyes football players
New England Patriots players
Philadelphia Eagles players
Saskatchewan Roughriders players